Graduate were an English new wave and mod revival musical group formed in 1978, in Bath, England. They were only mildly successful, and broke up by 1981. They are today best known as being the initial recording vehicle for future Tears for Fears members Roland Orzabal and Curt Smith, who found international fame in the 1980s and 1990s.

Band history
John Baker and Roland Orzabal were at school together and performed as the "Baker Brothers" in local pubs and clubs from 1977, when both were aged 16. The name Graduate came from the fact that they used to open shows with a cover of Simon and Garfunkel's "Mrs. Robinson", which was featured in the movie The Graduate. They were introduced to drummer Andy Marsden by their first manager Colin Wyatt who ran a local musical youth group of which Marsden was a member. Buck was also found by Colin Wyatt playing piano at a local nightspot in Bath, and for a while they played with various bass players until Smith was offered the role. Orzabal and Smith had played in a youth club band called Duckz when they were 14. In 1979, Graduate signed a publishing deal with Tony Hatch who subsequently offered the group to Pye Records. Graduate recorded their debut album Acting My Age at Crescent Studios Bath in January 1980. The first single "Elvis Should Play Ska" reached number 82 in the UK Singles Chart in April 1980 (whilst the band were on a 33-date UK tour supporting Judie Tzuke), although it fared better in Spain, reaching the Top 10. The band then travelled to Spain twice in 1980 to do TV and promotion work.

The band undertook a gruelling tour of Germany in October/November 1980, having to drive hundreds of miles between gigs with no roadies: this was the main reason given from Orzabal for quitting on their return. At this time he did not see his future as a live artist and wanted to concentrate on writing. Smith also left the band at this stage.

Graduate also appeared on UK TV during 1980. They performed "Ever Met a Day" on the children's TV show Runaround for Southern TV in Southampton. They also appeared on two episodes of RPM for BBC Bristol, playing three songs live on each occasion.

Graduate continued into 1981. Orzabal and Smith were replaced for a short while with Darren Hatch on bass (son of Tony Hatch and Jackie Trent) and Nigel Newton on guitar; during this time, the former two played with the short-lived band Neon, which included Pete Byrne and Rob Fisher, later of Naked Eyes. Graduate played a handful of local and London gigs and carried on the relationship with Pye/PRT. They recorded a number of demos with Ian Stanley in mid-1981. Baker and Buck became busy with European promotional work with the Korgis, and so Graduate fizzled out.

After Graduate
In 1981, Orzabal and Smith went on to form the new wave band Tears for Fears.

Andy Marsden played drums on the original single recording of "Suffer the Children".

John Baker later joined the Korgis, a band featuring members of Stackridge.

Baker joined Orzabal again in 1993, singing backing vocals on the UK and US hit "Break It Down Again".

Marsden and Baker still to this day play in a covers band, the Meanies, alongside former Graduate manager Glenn Tommey and James Warren of the Korgis.

Personnel
Roland Orzabal - vocals, lead guitar
Curt Smith - bass guitar, vocals
John Baker - rhythm guitar, vocals
Steve Buck - keyboards
Andy Marsden - drums

Albums

References

External links

Graduate Discography

English rock music groups
Musical groups established in 1979
Musical groups disestablished in 1981
English new wave musical groups
British mod revival groups
Musical groups from Somerset